This article displays the squads for the 2011 World Men's Handball Championship. Each team consisted of 16 players.

Appearances, goals and ages as of tournament start, 13 January 2011.

Group A

Head coach:  Bader Mirza

Head coach:  Jorn Lommel

Head coach:  Claude Onesta

Head coach:  Heiner Brand

Head coach:  Valero Rivera

Head coach:  Alain Portes

Group B

Head coach:  Magnus Andersson

Head coach:  Javier García Cuesta

Head coach:  Lajos Mocsai

Head coach:  Guðmundur Guðmundsson

Head coach:  Kiyoharu Sakamaki

Head coach:  Robert Hedin

Group C

Head coach:  Salah Bouchekriou

Head coach:  Taip Ramadani

Head coach:  Slavko Goluža

Head coach:  Ulrik Wilbek

Head coach:  Vasile Stîngă

Head coach:  Veselin Vuković

Group D

Head coach:  Eduardo Gallardo

Head coach:  Fernando Luis Capurro

Head coach:  Bogdan Wenta

Head coach:  Zoltán Heister

Head coach:  Cho Young-Shin

Head coach:  Staffan Olsson

Statistics

Coaches representation by country
Coaches in bold represent their own country.

References
 

World Mens Handball Championship Squads, 2011
World Handball Championship squads